The eighth and final season of the American television series Arrow premiered on The CW on October 15, 2019, and concluded on January 28, 2020, with a total of ten episodes. The series is based on the DC Comics character Green Arrow, a costumed vigilante created by Mort Weisinger and George Papp, and is set in the Arrowverse, sharing continuity with other Arrowverse television series and associated media. Executive producers Marc Guggenheim and Beth Schwartz returned as co-showrunners for this season.

Stephen Amell stars as Oliver Queen, with principal cast members David Ramsey as John Diggle, Rick Gonzalez as Rene Ramirez, Juliana Harkavy as Dinah Drake and Katie Cassidy as Laurel Lance also returning from previous seasons. Katherine McNamara, Ben Lewis, and Joseph David-Jones, who previously recurred as the adult versions of Mia Smoak, William Clayton and Connor Hawke, were all promoted to starring status, as was LaMonica Garrett, who stars across multiple Arrowverse shows as the Monitor. Former series regulars Emily Bett Rickards, Colin Donnell, Susanna Thompson, Paul Blackthorne, Colton Haynes, John Barrowman, Willa Holland, Echo Kellum, Sea Shimooka and Josh Segarra all returned as guests.

The series follows Oliver Queen, who claimed to have spent five years shipwrecked on Lian Yu, an island in the North China Sea, before returning home to Starling City (later renamed "Star City") to fight crime and corruption as a secret vigilante whose weapon of choice is a bow and arrow. This season follows Oliver as he fights in a battle that will have the multiverse hanging in the balance.

The series was renewed for an eighth and final season on January 31, 2019, and filming began in Vancouver, British Columbia, in July 2019. The eighth episode features the sixth annual Arrowverse crossover "Crisis on Infinite Earths", with TV series Supergirl, Batwoman, The Flash and Legends of Tomorrow also taking part. The ninth episode was set as a backdoor pilot to the later-scrapped spin-off titled Green Arrow and the Canaries which takes place in the year 2040.

Episodes

Cast and characters

Main 
 Stephen Amell as Oliver Queen / Green Arrow / Spectre
 David Ramsey as John Diggle / Spartan
 Rick Gonzalez as Rene Ramirez / Wild Dog
 Juliana Harkavy as Dinah Drake / Black Canary
 Katherine McNamara as adult Mia Smoak-Queen / Blackstar / Green Arrow
 Ben Lewis as adult William Clayton
 Joseph David-Jones as adult Connor Hawke
 LaMonica Garrett as Mar Novu / Monitor and Mobius / Anti-Monitor
 Katie Cassidy as Laurel Lance / Black Canary (Earth-2)

Recurring 
 Audrey Marie Anderson as Lyla Michaels / Harbinger
  Charlie Barnett as adult John Diggle Jr.
  Andrea Sixtos as adult Zoe Ramirez
 Willa Holland as Thea Queen
 Colton Haynes as Roy Harper / Arsenal
 Paul Blackthorne as Quentin Lance

Guest

"Crisis on Infinite Earths"

Production

Development 
On January 31, 2019, The CW renewed Arrow for an eighth season. On March 6, 2019, it was announced that it would be the final season of the series, with an abbreviated ten-episode order. Stephen Amell, who stars as Oliver Queen / Green Arrow, had approached series co-creator Greg Berlanti towards the end of the sixth season about "mov[ing] on" following the expiration of his contract at the end of the seventh season. He had hoped that the series could continue without him, but Berlanti and showrunners Marc Guggenheim and Beth Schwartz decided to conclude the series with a shortened eighth season, which Amell agreed to.

Berlanti, Guggenheim and Schwartz released a press statement saying, "This was a difficult decision to come to, but like every hard decision we’ve made for the past seven years, it was with the best interests of Arrow in mind [...] We're heartened by the fact that Arrow has birthed an entire universe of shows that will continue on for many years to come. We're excited about crafting a conclusion that honors the show, its characters and its legacy and are grateful to all the writers, producers, actors, and – more importantly – the incredible crew that has sustained us and the show for over seven years."

Speaking at San Diego Comic-Con ahead of the season premiere, Guggenheim commented on the difficulty of approaching the final season without Emily Bett Rickards, who made the decision to step away from her role as Felicity Smoak at the end of the seventh season. He stated that "for the longest time, I've been saying you can't do the show without Emily Rickards. And I think, if the show – if the conversations had been, 'we'll do 22 episodes without Emily,' I would've said, 'you can't do that'", and that the shorter ten-episode run, combined with the crossover, made the prospect feel "a little more realistic".

Writing 
As with the seventh season of Arrow, the eighth season makes extensive use of flashforwards. Stephen Amell revealed that, unlike the serialized approach of previous seasons, this one would follow a more episodic approach due to the limited number of episodes. Katie Cassidy, who plays Laurel Lance, supported Amell's claim, saying each episode would feel like a "miniature movie". The penultimate episode, which serves as a backdoor pilot to Green Arrow and the Canaries was originally intended to be titled after the Bruce Springsteen song "Livin' in the Future", continuing the series' tradition of having the penultimate episode of every season titled after a Springsteen song. Because the studio mandated that the backdoor pilot be titled after the planned spin-off series, the writers were forced to scrap the original title.

Casting 
Main cast members Stephen Amell, David Ramsey, Rick Gonzalez, Juliana Harkavy and Katie Cassidy returned as Oliver Queen / Green Arrow, John Diggle, Rene Ramirez, Dinah Drake and Earth-2's Laurel Lance respectively. Following the announcement that she would be leaving the series at the end of its seventh season, this was the first and only season not to feature Emily Bett Rickards, who portrayed Felicity Smoak, as either a recurring or main cast member, although the producers left open the possibility of her making a guest appearance in the final season. Rickards appears as Felicity through archive footage in the episodes "Welcome to Hong Kong" and "Green Arrow & The Canaries". In November 2019, Amell confirmed that Rickards would return for the series finale.

In June 2019, Joseph David-Jones, who recurred in the seventh season as the adult version of Connor Hawke, was promoted to the main cast, and that July Katherine McNamara and Ben Lewis were also promoted to regular status in their roles as the adult versions of Mia Smoak and William Clayton respectively. It was also announced that former series regulars Colin Donnell, Josh Segarra, John Barrowman and Susanna Thompson would reprise their roles as Tommy Merlyn, Adrian Chase, Malcolm Merlyn and Moira Queen in a guest capacity. In August, it was announced that Colton Haynes, who portrayed Roy Harper as a series regular in the seventh season, would not return with the same status, though Schwartz stated that she hoped to have him back in some capacity. Haynes said he did not exit the season, but that he was "not asked to come back for the final season as a series regular", and added that Roy is "never gone for too long". In September, it was announced that Willa Holland would return as Thea Queen in a recurring role, after departing as a regular in the sixth season and returning as a guest star in the seventh. In the same month, Charlie Barnett was cast in the role of the adult version of John Diggle Jr. In October, it was announced that Haynes would appear in the season in a recurring role. In November, it was announced that Paul Blackthorne would return as Quentin Lance in a recurring role, after departing as a regular in the sixth season and returning as a guest star in the seventh.

Design 
In July 2019, a new Green Arrow costume was unveiled on the Entertainment Weekly magazine cover. A new Spartan costume was revealed by Guggenheim and a new Black Canary costume was revealed in the season's first trailer.

Filming 
Filming began on July 11, 2019, and lasted until November 13. The season's third episode, "Leap of Faith", marks Cassidy's directorial debut. On October 21, filming for the ninth episode, the backdoor pilot for Green Arrow and the Canaries, began.

Arrowverse tie-ins 
In December 2018, during the end of that year's Arrowverse crossover "Elseworlds", a follow-up crossover – titled "Crisis on Infinite Earths" and based on the comic book series of the same name – was announced. The crossover took place over five episodes – three in December 2019, and two (including the Arrow episode) in January 2020.

Release

Broadcast 
The season premiered on October 15, 2019, in the United States on The CW. Additionally, The CW aired a retrospective special titled "Hitting the Bullseye" which preceded the series finale.

Home media 
The season was released on DVD and Blu-ray on April 28, 2020 with special features including the show's 2019 San Diego Comic-Con panel, the special "Hitting the Bullseye" and all five episodes of the sixth annual Arrowverse crossover event, "Crisis on Infinite Earths".

Reception

Critical response 
The review aggregation website Rotten Tomatoes reports a 95% approval rating for the eighth season, with an average rating of 7.5/10 based on 125 reviews. The site's critics consensus reads, "Oliver Queen's final adventure hits emotional peaks while spearheading the game-changing 'Crisis on Infinite Earths', giving the Emerald Archer a rousing sendoff."

Katie Cassidy's portrayal of Earth-2 Laurel Lance was praised by critics, with TVLine calling her development "one of the most enjoyable aspects of Arrow‘s 10-episode farewell run". Cassidy additionally received an honorable mention on TVLine's Performer of the Week for her performance on "Welcome to Hong Kong".

Ratings

Notes

References 

Arrow (TV series) seasons
2019 American television seasons
2020 American television seasons
Television series set in 2019
Television series set in 2020